Sí ("Yes") is the third album by the Mexican singer-songwriter Julieta Venegas. She co-produced the album with Cachorro López and Coti Sorokin. After the success of this album, it was re-released in 2005 including 9 new tracks and a DVD.
The album won the Latin Grammy Award for Best Rock Solo Vocal Album and received a nomination for Grammy Award for Best Latin Rock/Alternative Album. Worldwide, the album has sold 3.5 million copies.

Track listing

^ Co-producer

Sí (Edición Especial)

Track listing

Singles

Andar Conmigo (2003)
Lento (2004)
Algo Está Cambiando (2004)
Oleada (2005)

Personnel

 Julieta Venegas - vocals, background vocals, accordion, drum machine, keyboards, acoustic guitar, electric guitar, piano
 Coti Sorokin - acoustic guitar, electric guitar, Bass guitar, vocals (background)
 Adrían Schinoff - keyboards, programming
 Matías Sorolin - slide guitar, vocals (background)
 Juan Blas Caballero - programming, keyboards, scratch
 Sebastían Schon - electric guitar, keyboards
 Cachorro López - bass guitar
 Javier Casalla - violin

Production
 Producers: Cachorro López, Coti Sorokin
 Co-producer: Julieta Venegas
 Engineers: Cachorro López, Coti Sorokin
 Mixing: César Sogbe
 Assistant mixing: Sebastián Schon
 Mastering: Don Tyler
 A&R direction: Guillermo Guitiérrez
 A&R coordination: Gilda Oropeza
 Photography: Eduardo Martí
 Design: Ros

Charts and certifications

Weekly charts

Certifications

Awards

Latin Grammy Award

Premios Oye!

Grammy Award

Release history

References

2003 albums
Julieta Venegas albums
2005 video albums
Music video compilation albums
2005 compilation albums
Albums produced by Cachorro López
Latin Grammy Award for Best Rock Solo Vocal Album